Andrew Cronje (born 15 May 1984) is a South African field hockey player who competed in the 2008 and 2012 Summer Olympics.  After a year's break, he returned to international hockey at the 2014 Commonwealth Games.

References

External links
 

1984 births
Living people
South African male field hockey players
Olympic field hockey players of South Africa
Field hockey players at the 2008 Summer Olympics
Field hockey players at the 2012 Summer Olympics
Alumni of Rondebosch Boys' High School
Field hockey players at the 2014 Commonwealth Games
Commonwealth Games competitors for South Africa
Field hockey players from Johannesburg
2006 Men's Hockey World Cup players
21st-century South African people